Otto Scharmer (born 1961) is an American academic who is a senior lecturer at the MIT Sloan School of Management, and co-founder of the Presencing Institute (now seemingly subsumed into u-school for Transformation). At Massachusetts Institute of Technology, he chairs the IDEAS Global Challenge program for cross-sector innovation and is the author/co-author of several books. He focuses on action research.

Education
Scharmer studied economics at Witten/Herdecke University in Germany, where receiving his diploma and PhD.

Career
In 2015 Otto co-founded the MITx u.lab, a massive open online course with more than 140,000 users from 185 countries.

Awards and honors
He received the Jamieson Prize for Excellence in Teaching at MIT (2015), and the EU Leonardo Corporate Learning Award for the contributions of Theory U to the future of management (2016). In 2017 he was ranked #1 of the world's top 30 education professionals by globalgurus.org.

Selected publications

References

External links 

Living people
MIT Sloan School of Management faculty
1961 births